The American Association of University Professors (AAUP) is an organization of professors and other academics in the United States. AAUP membership includes over 500 local campus chapters and 39 state organizations.

The AAUP's stated mission is to advance academic freedom and shared governance, to define fundamental professional values and standards for higher education, and to ensure higher education's contribution to the common good. Founded in 1915 by Arthur O. Lovejoy and John Dewey, the AAUP has helped to shape American higher education by developing the standards and procedures that maintain quality in education and academic freedom in the country's colleges and universities. Irene Mulvey is the current president.

History 

AAUP formed as the "Association of University Professors" in 1915.  Among the events that led to its founding was the 1900 dismissal of eugenicist, economics professor, and sociologist Edward Alsworth Ross from Stanford University. Ross's work criticizing the employment of Chinese laborers by the Southern Pacific Railroad, run by Stanford's founder Leland Stanford, led Leland's widow, Jane Stanford, to intervene and, over the objections of the president and the faculty, to succeed in getting Ross eventually dismissed.

In February 1915, the dismissals of two professors and two instructors at the University of Utah by President Joseph T. Kingsbury — and the subsequent resignations of 14 faculty members in protest — launched the AAUP's first institutional academic freedom inquest, spearheaded by AAUP founders Arthur O. Lovejoy (Secretary) and John Dewey (President). A similar 1911 controversy at Brigham Young University in Provo, Utah, involving some of the same professors, led in part to the University of Utah debacle.

The AAUP published, in December 1915, its inaugural volume of the Bulletin of the American Association of University Professors, including the document now known as the 1915 Declaration of Principles on Academic Freedom and Academic Tenure — the AAUP's foundational statement on the rights and corresponding obligations of members of the academic profession. Since 2010 the AAUP has published the Journal of Academic Freedom, an online-only open-access annual periodical.

Statement of Principles on Academic Freedom and Tenure 

As the American Association of University Professors (AAUP) details the history of their policy on academic freedom and tenure, the association maintains that there "are still people who want to control what professors teach and write." The AAUP's
"Statement of Principles on Academic Freedom and Tenure" is the definitive articulation of the principles and practices and is widely accepted throughout the academic community. The association's procedures ensuring academic due process remain the model for professional employment practices on campuses throughout the country.

The association suggests that "The principles of Academic Freedom and Tenure" date back to a 1925 conference. R.M. O'Neil's history suggests that the formal origins of the statement of academic freedom in the United States begins with an earlier 1915 "declaration of principles," when the "fledgling" AAUP first convened.

While it seems common sense that academic freedom aligns with the values of democratic rights and free speech, O'Neil also notes the ideas of academic freedom at the time were not entirely well received, and even the New York Times criticized the declaration, but that today the statement remains "almost as nearly inviolate as the U.S. Constitution." The AAUP notes that following a series of conferences beginning in 1934, the association officially adopted the "1925 Statement of Principles on Academic Freedom and Tenure," which started to become institutionalized in universities only in the 1940s.

The AAUP offers the original principles, including the 1940 interpretations of the statement and a 1970 interpretation, which codified evaluation of the principles since the time they were adopted. The statement is straightforward, based on three principles of academic freedom. Briefly summarized, the first principle states that teachers are entitled to "full freedom in research and in publication of the results" and that the issue of financial gains from research depends on the relationship with the institution. The second principle of academic freedom is that teachers should have the same freedom in the classroom. The third asserts that college and university professors are citizens and should be free to speak and write as citizens "free from institutional censorship."

Based upon five principles, the statement on academic tenure is equally simple and to the point. The first principle maintains that the terms of appointment are to be stated in writing. The second details the conditions and length of time professors are given to attain tenure. The third notes that during the probationary period before attaining tenure, the teacher "should have all the academic freedom that all other members of the faculty have." Detailing terms for appeal of the decision to deny tenure, the fourth point notes that both faculty and the institution's governing board should judge whether tenure is to be granted or denied. The final point suggests that if the faculty member is not granted tenure appointment for reasons of financial restraint upon the university, the "financial exigency should be demonstrably bona fide."

Noting the Supreme Court case Keyishian v. Board of Regents (1967), which established the constitutionality and legal basis for the AAUP's principles of academic freedom, the 1970 interpretations believes that the statement is not a "static code but a fundamental document to set a framework of norms to guide adaptations to changing times and circumstances." The commentary iterates key points of the 1940 interpretations. The statement does not discourage controversy but emphasizes professionalism, believing that professors should be careful "not to introduce into their teaching controversial matter which has no relation to their subject."

The interpretive statement also maintains that while professors have the rights of citizens, both scholars and educational officers "should remember that the public may judge their profession and their institution by their utterances," noting that every effort should be made "to indicate they are not speaking for the institution." The comments provide for further insights into the evaluation for tenure appointment and direct to the "1968 Recommended Institutional Regulations on Academic Freedom and Tenure," which recommends policy based upon the 1940 statement and a later documents on standards for faculty dismissal.

Statement on Government of Colleges and Universities 

The American Association of University Professors published its first "Statement on Government of Colleges and Universities" in 1920, "emphasizing the importance of faculty involvement in personnel decisions, selection of administrators, preparation of the budget, and determination of educational policies. Refinements to the statement were introduced in subsequent years, culminating in the 1966 "Statement on Government of Colleges and Universities."

The statement was jointly formulated by the American Association of University Professors, the American Council on Education (ACE), and the Association of Governing Boards of Universities and Colleges (AGB). The statement clarifies the respective roles of governing boards, faculties, and administrations. The document does not provide for a "blueprint" to the governance of higher education.

Also, the purpose of the statement was not to provide principles for relations with industry and government although it establishes direction on "the correction of existing weaknesses." Rather, the statement aimed to establish a shared vision for the internal governance of institutions. Student involvement is not addressed in detail. The statement concerns general education policy and internal operations with an overview of the formal roles for governing structures in the organization and management of higher education.

Conflict with religious institutions 
Some scholars have criticized the AAUP's "antipathy toward religious colleges and universities." And the AAUP has censured numerous religious institutions, including Brigham Young University and The Catholic University of America. Others have criticized the AAUP's current stance regarding academic freedom in religious institutions as contradicting its 1940 statement on academic freedom, which permits religious institutions to place limits on academic freedom if those limitations are clearly stated. In 1970, the AAUP criticized its 1940 statement, positing that most religious institutions "no longer need or desire" to place limits on academic freedom.

In 1988, the AAUP offered up another interpretation, stating that the "1970 de-endorsement clause" requires a religious institution to forfeit its "right to represent itself as an 'authentic seat of higher learning.'" But the AAUP's Committee A did not endorse it, thus the issue on whether a religious institution can place limits on academic freedom if those limitations are clearly stated appears to be unresolved.

Contingent faculty 
In recent decades, the AAUP has added a focus on addressing the dramatic increase in faculty positions off the tenure track. An increasing percentage of faculty has become "contingent," or non-tenure track. Many are hired into part-time positions, often multiple part-time positions which together equal a full-time load or more, but with dramatically lower pay, little job security, and few or no fringe benefits. As of 2005, 48 percent of all faculty served in part-time appointments, and non-tenure-track positions of all types accounted for 68 percent of all faculty appointments in American higher education.

The AAUP has released a number of reports on contingent faculty: in 2008, a report on accreditors' guidelines pertaining to part-time faculty and a report of an investigation involving alleged violations of the academic freedom and due process rights of a full-time contingent faculty member; and in 2006, an index providing data on the number of contingent faculty at various colleges. Also in 2006, the AAUP adopted a new policy dealing with the job protections that should be afforded to part-time faculty members. In 2003, it released its major policy statement Contingent Appointments and the Academic Profession. The statement makes new recommendations in two areas: increasing the proportion of faculty appointments that are on the tenure line as well as improving job security and due process protections for those with contingent appointments.

Collective bargaining 

In 2009, AAUP began its reorganization the formal separation of the previously-muddied relationship between its thinktank, its lobbying in non-organized chapters (called Advocacy), and its support for Collective Bargaining Chapters. AAUP currently represents approximately 70 affiliates across the United States in such institutions as University of Connecticut, Portland State University, University of Alaska, the California State University system, Rutgers, University of Oregon, Eastern Michigan University, University of Illinois Chicago, University of Rhode Island, State University of New York, and many others in both the public and private sector, as well as a large number of affiliate organizations in which affiliation is shared with other labor unions, the most common dual affiliation being with the American Federation of Teachers (AFT).

Unlike the American Federation of Teachers and other more traditional labor unions, AAUP is not a servicing parent organization. All of its affiliates (at least those that are not affiliated with any other labor union) are independent organizations that completely provide for all their own services, such as staff, attorneys, consultants and organizers. Also, the AAUP does not have the power of receivership in its constitution and so it can not take over any of its affiliates, supplant any of its elected leaders, or dictate policy or bargaining proposals or agenda upon them.

Several university chapters have been involved in labor strikes, including the 1979 Boston University strike and the 2021 Oregon Tech strike.

See also 
 National Conference of University Professors (UK)
 Professors in the United States
 University organizations (annotated list)

References

External links 
 

 
Educational organizations based in the United States
Organizations established in 1915
Academic freedom
Professional associations based in the United States
Education-related professional associations